Omar Ibrahim Ghalawanji (born 1954) is a Syrian politician who was the caretaker Prime Minister of Syria in August 2012, following the defection of Riyad Farid Hijab.

Early life and education
Ghalawanji was born in 1954 to a Sunni family residing in the Tartus Governorate. He earned a degree in civil engineering from the Tishreen University in 1978.

Career
Ghalawanji was the director of a number of the Military Housing Establishment's directorates from 1978 to 2000. He was also the deputy chairman of Lattakia City Council from 1997 to 2000. He served as the director of the General Housing Establishment, a member of the Advisory Committee of the Arab Housing Ministers Council and of the Board of Directors of the Arab Union Contracting Company.

Prime Minister
On 6 August 2012, Ghalawanji was announced as the head of a Syrian caretaker government, succeeding prime minister Riyad Farid Hijab.

See also
Cabinet of Syria

References

External links
Ministry of Local Administration official government website

1954 births
Living people
Prime Ministers of Syria
Tishreen University alumni
People from Tartus Governorate